Pinecrest, California may refer to:
Pinecrest, Nevada County, California, an unincorporated community in Nevada County
Pinecrest, Tuolumne County, California, an unincorporated community in Tuolumne County